Honnecourt-sur-Escaut (literally  Honnecourt on Escaut) is a commune in the Nord department in northern France.

Heraldry

See also
Communes of the Nord department

References

Honnecourtsurescaut